Lacmellea edulis, common name: chicle muyu, is a species of tree in the family Apocynaceae native to Panama, Colombia, Venezuela, Brazil, Peru and Ecuador.

References

External links
Lacmellea edulis at Useful Tropical Plants.

Rauvolfioideae
Flora of South America
Flora of Central America
Plants described in 1857